In enzymology, a 2-acylglycerophosphocholine O-acyltransferase is an enzyme that catalyzes the chemical reaction

acyl-CoA + 2-acyl-sn-glycero-3-phosphocholine  CoA + phosphatidylcholine

Thus, the two substrates of this enzyme are acyl-CoA and 2-acyl-sn-glycero-3-phosphocholine, whereas its two products are CoA and phosphatidylcholine.

This enzyme belongs to the family of transferases, specifically those acyltransferases transferring groups other than aminoacyl groups.  The systematic name of this enzyme class is acyl-CoA:2-acyl-sn-glycero-3-phosphocholine O-acyltransferase. Other names in common use include 2-acylglycerol-3-phosphorylcholine acyltransferase, and 2-acylglycerophosphocholine acyltransferase.  This enzyme participates in glycerophospholipid metabolism.

References

 
 

EC 2.3.1
Enzymes of unknown structure